John "Jack" Bernard May (17 November 1925 – 10 August 2012) was an amateur tennis player who won over 200 tennis titles in Australia.

History    
May played many sports, but his favorite and best was tennis. One of his more important achievements was to reach the mixed doubles final of the 1951 Australian Championship.  

He was trained and practiced as a dental technician, and May became an employee of Spalding Australia (A.G Spalding). He grew Spalding from a small supplier to its becoming a big manufacturer, especially in golf ball production.

In 1965, he and his family moved from Sydney to Melbourne (Spalding Head Office) where he remained for the rest of his life. He purchased the Sherrin Football Company in 1972, which manufactured AFL footballs in agreement with Tom Sherrin (Sherrin’s owner).

May improved Spalding’s overall performance and market share in the large golfing market. Hot Dot and Top Flite golf balls became big sellers and took Spalding’s market share from under 20% to almost 70%. Spalding asked Jack to move to Canada with the intention of moving him to the U.S., but Jack’s family decided to remain in Australia, so he turned down the offer.

In his 1979 autobiography, Jack Kramer recalled that he saw May play in Australia. Unaware of who he was but impressed with his skills, he asked who was on the court. Kramer was told he is "just a weekend player", and Kramer said "he must be the best weekend player in the world".

Achievements 

 Over 200 Tennis titles in Australia (recorded wins over Don Candy, Ken Rosewall, Frank Sedgman and John Newcombe) 
 Won Sydney Singles Championship 13 times
 Won Sydney Doubles Championship 11 times
 Won Northern Suburbs Singles 11 times
 Won Northern Suburbs Doubles 10 times

Grand Slam finals

Honours 
 Life Member of the Australian Davis Cup Federation and President for 25 years.
 Tennis Australia National Award for Services to the Game 
 Councillor of the Victorian Tennis Association. Awarded with Highly Commended Service Award in 1986 and Victorian Spirit of Tennis Award in 1999.

Private life 
Jack was married to Patricia May (Everitt) on 3 August 1957. They had four children: Michelle, Jon, Martin and Rod.

References 

1925 births
2012 deaths
Australian male tennis players
Tennis players from Melbourne